Eugenie Magnus Ingleton (1873 - 3 August 1936) was a British screenwriter, actress, and war correspondent. She started acting on the stage at the age of ten playing Little Eva in Uncle Tom’s Cabin.
She worked as a war correspondent in South Africa during the Second Boer War before moving to the United States.
She worked mainly as a screenwriter but got also involved in stage design and other tasks around the set.

Selected filmography
 The Butterfly on the Wheel (1915)
 Trilby (1915)
 The Reward of the Faithless (1917)
 The Lair of the Wolf (1917)
 Heart Strings (1917)
 The Pulse of Life (1917)
 Because of a Woman (1917)
 The Birth of Patriotism (1917)
 The Moonstone (1915)
The Loyalty of Taro San (1918)
 Love's Prisoner (1919)
 The Blue Bonnet (1919)
 Below the Surface (1920)
 The Secret of the Hills (1921)
 Alimony (1924)
 The Scarlet Honeymoon (1925)
 The Kiss Barrier (1925)

References

External links

1873 births
1936 deaths
Women film pioneers
20th-century British screenwriters